Nousiainen is a Finnish surname. Notable people with the surname include:

 Heikki Nousiainen (born 1945), Finnish actor
 Mikko Nousiainen (born 1975), Finnish actor
 Mona-Liisa Nousiainen (1983–2019), Finnish cross country skier
 Viljo Nousiainen (1944–1999),  Sweden Finn athletics coach
 Ville Nousiainen (born 1983), Finnish cross-country skier

Finnish-language surnames